Piotr Grzegorz Rysiukiewicz (born 14 July 1974 in Świebodzin, Lubuskie) is a retired Polish sprinter who won various medals for the Polish 4 x 400 metres relay during its greatest years in the late 1990s and early 2000s. He would usually run the first leg of competitions.

He is an older brother of another sprinter, Agnieszka Rysiukiewicz.

Competition record

1 Did not finish in the semifinals

2 Disqualified in the final

Personal bests
Outdoor
 200 metres – 21.31 s (1999)
 400 metres – 45.54 s (Seville 1999)

Indoor
 200 metres – 21.73 s (Spała 2003)
 400 metres – 46.63 s (Spała 1999)

See also
 Polish records in athletics

References

External links
 

Polish male sprinters
Athletes (track and field) at the 1996 Summer Olympics
Athletes (track and field) at the 2000 Summer Olympics
Athletes (track and field) at the 2004 Summer Olympics
Olympic athletes of Poland
1974 births
Living people
People from Świebodzin
World Athletics Championships medalists
European Athletics Championships medalists
Sportspeople from Lubusz Voivodeship
Goodwill Games medalists in athletics
Śląsk Wrocław athletes
World Athletics Indoor Championships winners
World Athletics Indoor Championships medalists
Competitors at the 1998 Goodwill Games